Dingagyun is a village in Madaya Township in Pyin Oo Lwin District in the Mandalay Division of central Myanmar. It lies north west of Mandalay city and on the Ayeyarwady River.

References

External links
Maplandia World Gazetteer

Populated places in Pyin Oo Lwin District
Madaya Township